Glenn Gonzales Donaire (born December 7, 1979) is a Filipino American former professional boxer who competed from 2000 to 2012, and challenged twice for world titles at flyweight and light flyweight. He is the older brother of former four-weight world champion Nonito Donaire.

Boxing career
Originally a bus driver, Glenn Donaire compiled a 52-8 amateur record and earning various local and regional titles, made it to the semi-finals of the US Olympic Trials in 2000 and lost a highly disputed decision to former world champion Brian Viloria. Glenn is very proud to be a Filipino boxer and has worn the Philippine flag on his trunks his entire career. He wears blue boxing trunks while his younger brother Nonito wears red boxing trunks to represent the Philippine flag.

November 22, 2003 Glenn Donaire won his first professional title by defeating Wangpanom Vor Saktawee by a 12 round decision in Guam for the WBO Asia Pacific flyweight title.

May 5, 2006, Glenn won the NABO and NABA flyweight titles by defeating Cesar Lopez by a 12 round decision.  The scores were 115-112, 116-111 and 117-110.  Lopez was docked a point for low blows.  Glenn was offered the fight after his brother Nonito was injured.

October 7, 2006, Donaire got a shot at Vic Darchinyan's IBF flyweight title. However, he lost to Darchinyan by a sixth round technical decision. The fight was stopped in the 4th round due to a broken/locked jaw suffered by Donaire from an alleged elbow attack. Replays show no evidence of an elbow, and Darchinyan's camp has always claimed this should have been a legitimate knockout. The scores were 60-53 on all three cards for Darchinyan. For 1 year, 4 months and 15 days, Donaire had been inactive.

After the long hiatus Glenn Donaire took on Jose Albuquerque on February 22, 2008. Donaire won the bout by unanimous decision.

Subsequently, Donaire moved up a weight class and defeated Omar Salado in Mexico City to win the vacant WBC Latino super flyweight title by unanimous decision on March 16, 2012.

References

External links
 

1979 births
Living people
Filipino emigrants to the United States
Filipino male boxers
Boxers from California
American sportspeople of Filipino descent
American male boxers
Sportspeople from General Santos
Boxers from South Cotabato
Light-flyweight boxers
Flyweight boxers